Ronald Edward "Ron" Stallings, Jr. (born February 25, 1983) is an American mixed martial artist who competes in the Middleweight division. A professional competitor since 2003, Stallings has also formerly competed for Strikeforce, Titan FC, and the UFC.

Background
Stallings was born and raised in Durham, North Carolina and began training in martial arts at the age of seven. Stallings attended Joppatowne High School and later Morgan State University.

Mixed martial arts career

Early career
Stallings began training in 2000 and made his professional MMA debut in July 2003. He competed primarily in regional promotions where he compiled a record of 12-6 with one no contest before signing with the UFC.

Strikeforce
With a record of 9-4 with one no contest, Stallings made his Strikeforce debut on July 22, 2011 at Strikeforce Challengers: Voelker vs. Bowling III against Adlan Amagov. Stallings lost via split decision.

Ultimate Fighting Championship
Stallings made his promotional debut as a short notice replacement against Uriah Hall on January 18, 2015 at UFC Fight Night 59, replacing an injured Louis Taylor. Hall won via TKO in the first round after knocking Stallings down with a punch and following up with several more on the ground. When Stallings returned to his feet, referee Herb Dean stopped the fight to check a cut that had opened up on Stallings' face, and the ringside doctor declared the cut too severe for Stallings to continue.

Stallings faced Justin Jones on April 4, 2015 at UFC Fight Night 63.  Stallings won via unanimous decision.

Stallings faced Joe Riggs on September 5, 2015 at UFC 191.  Stallings lost the bout via disqualification after he landed an illegal upkick, which rendered Riggs unable to continue. Subsequently, Stallings was released from the promotion.

Titan Fighting Championship
Stallings made his promotional debut against Rashaun Spencer on August 5, 2016 at Titan FC 40. Stallings won via split decision.

Mixed martial arts record

|-
| Win
| align=center| 15–8 (1) 
| Nah-Shon Burrell
| Decision (unanimous)
| CES MMA 52
| 
| align=center| 3
| align=center| 5:00
| Lincoln, Rhode Island, United States
|
|-
| Win
| align=center| 14–8 (1) 
| Rashaun Spencer
| Decision (split)
| Titan FC 40
| 
| align=center| 3
| align=center| 5:00
| Coral Gables, Florida, United States
|
|-
| Loss
| align=center| 13–8 (1) 
| Joe Riggs
| DQ (illegal upkick)
| UFC 191
| 
| align=center| 2
| align=center| 2:28
| Las Vegas, Nevada, United States
| 
|-
| Win
| align=center| 13–7 (1)
| Justin Jones
| Decision (unanimous)
| UFC Fight Night: Mendes vs. Lamas
| 
| align=center| 3
| align=center| 5:00
| Fairfax, Virginia, United States
| 
|-
| Loss
| align=center| 12–7 (1)
| Uriah Hall
| TKO (doctor stoppage)
| UFC Fight Night: McGregor vs. Siver
| 
| align=center| 1
| align=center| 3:37
| Boston, Massachusetts, United States
| 
|-
| Loss
| align=center| 12–6 (1)
| Tim Williams
| Decision (unanimous)
| CFFC 43: Webb vs. Good
| 
| align=center| 5
| align=center| 5:00
| Atlantic City, New Jersey, United States
| 
|-
| Win
| align=center| 12–5 (1)
| Joshua Williams
| TKO (punches)
| Warfare 12: Rise of the Champions
| 
| align=center| 3
| align=center| N/A
| North Myrtle Beach, South Carolina, United States
| 
|-
| Win
| align=center| 11–5 (1)
| Mike Massenzio
| TKO (knee to the body)
| Ring of Combat 42
| 
| align=center| 1
| align=center| 4:03
| Atlantic City, New Jersey, United States
| 
|-
| Win
| align=center| 10–5 (1)
| Willie Smalls
| Submission (rear-naked choke)
| Black and Blue: Rebel Invasion 2
| 
| align=center| 2
| align=center| 3:19
| Tallapoosa, Georgia, United States
| 
|-
| Loss
| align=center| 9–5 (1)
| Adlan Amagov
| Decision (split)
| Strikeforce Challengers: Voelker vs. Bowling III
| 
| align=center| 3
| align=center| 5:00
| Las Vegas, Nevada, United States
| 
|-
| Win
| align=center| 9–4 (1)
| Joey Kirwan
| Submission (triangle choke)
| UWC 8: Judgment Day
| 
| align=center| 2
| align=center| 0:52
| Fairfax, Virginia, United States
| 
|-
| Win
| align=center| 8–4 (1)
| Fred Weaver
| TKO (punches)
| Gameness Fighting Championship 6
| 
| align=center| 2
| align=center| 0:12
| Memphis, Tennessee, United States
| 
|-
| Loss
| align=center| 7–4 (1)
| Damian Dantibo
| TKO (head kick and punches)
| UWC 6: Capital Punishment
| 
| align=center| 1
| align=center| 0:13
| Fairfax, Virginia, United States
| 
|-
| Win
| align=center| 7–3 (1)
| Herbert Goodman
| KO (knees)
| UWC 5: Man O' War
| 
| align=center| 1
| align=center| 4:56
| Fairfax, Virginia, United States
| 
|-
| Win
| align=center| 6–3 (1)
| Tony Sousa
| TKO (punches)
| UWC 4: Confrontation
| 
| align=center| 2
| align=center| 1:02
| Fairfax, Virginia, United States
| 
|-
| Loss
| align=center| 5–3 (1)
| Timothy Woods
| KO (slam)
| UWC 3: Invasion
| 
| align=center| 1
| align=center| 1:25
| Fairfax, Virginia, United States
| 
|-
| Win
| align=center| 5–2 (1)
| Eric Lambert
| Submission (guillotine choke)
| CSC 24: The Proving Ground
| 
| align=center| 1
| align=center| 2:41
| Richmond, Virginia, United States
| 
|-
| Win
| align=center| 4–2 (1)
| Bill Frazier
| TKO (punches)
| Combat Sport Challenge
| 
| align=center| 1
| align=center| 3:58
| Richmond, Virginia, United States
| 
|-
| Loss
| align=center| 3–2 (1)
| Dante Rivera
| Decision (unanimous)
| Reality Fighting 11
| 
| align=center| 3
| align=center| 4:00
| Atlantic City, New Jersey, United States
|For the RF Middleweight Championship.
|-
| NC
| align=center| 3–1 (1)
| Ted Govola 
| No Contest
| Mass Destruction 19
| 
| align=center| N/A
| align=center| N/A
| Boston, Massachusetts, United States
|For the vacant MD Middleweight Championship.
|-
| Win
| align=center| 3–1
| Randy Rowe
| Submission (triangle choke)
| Mass Destruction 16
| 
| align=center| 1
| align=center| 4:32
| Boston, Massachusetts, United States
|Return to Middleweight.
|-
| Win
| align=center| 2–1
| Mike Varner
| Submission (rear-naked choke)
| Mass Destruction 14
| 
| align=center| 1
| align=center| N/A
| Taunton, Massachusetts, United States
|Heavyweight debut; won the vacant MD Heavyweight Championship.
|-
| Win
| align=center| 1–1
| Rocco Giordano
| Submission (armbar)
| Reality Fighting 5
| 
| align=center| 2
| align=center| 0:58
| Atlantic City, New Jersey, United States
| 
|-
| Loss
| align=center| 0–1
| Phillipe Nover
| Submission (guillotine choke)
| Reality Fighting 4
| 
| align=center| 1
| align=center| 0:43
| Bayonne, New Jersey, United States
|

See also
 List of male mixed martial artists

References

External links

1983 births
Living people
American male mixed martial artists
Middleweight mixed martial artists
Mixed martial artists utilizing Brazilian jiu-jitsu
Ultimate Fighting Championship male fighters
American practitioners of Brazilian jiu-jitsu